Dechtice is a municipality of Trnava District in the Trnava region of Slovakia.

Genealogical resources
The records for genealogical research are available at the state archive "Statny Archiv in Bratislava, Slovakia":

 Roman Catholic church records (births/marriages/deaths): 1657-1900 (parish A)
 Lutheran church records (births/marriages/deaths): 1666-1895 (parish B)

See also
 List of municipalities and towns in Slovakia

External links
 http://www.dechtice.sk
 https://web.archive.org/web/20070427022352/http://www.statistics.sk/mosmis/eng/run.html

Villages and municipalities in Trnava District